Śródmieście Południowe is a neighbourhood, and an area of the Municipal Information System, in the city of Warsaw, Poland, located within the district of Śródmieście (Downtown).

Culture 
In Śródmieście Południowe are located many cultural institutions. In the district are located many museums. It includes the National Museum, which is the largest museum in the city, and one of the largest in Poland. Other notable museums are: Polish Army Museum, Museum of the Earth of the Polish Academy of Sciences, and Museum of Life in the Polish People's Republic. In Śródmieście Południowe also operate numerous theaters, such as Contemporary Theatre, Roma Musical Theatre, TR Warszawa, Polonia Theatre, Syrena Theatre, and Studio Buffo. There is also the Warsaw Fotoplastikon. In the district is also located the historical Kino Luna cinema.

Administrative boundaries and divisions 
Śródmieście Południowe is located within the district of Śródmieście (Downtown). Its boundaries are determined by the Jerusalem Avenue to the north, the Chałubińskiego Street and the Niepodległości Avenue to the west, the Stefana Batorego Street, the Boya-Żeleńskiego Street, and the Jana Chrystiana Szucha Avenue to the south, and the Ujazdów Avenue, the Piękna Street, and the Rozbrat Street to the east.

Śródmieście Południowe includes two smaller neighborhoods: Marshal's Residential District (Polish: Marszałkowska Dzielnica Mieszkaniowa, MDM), and Latawiec.

Notes

References 

Srodmiescie Poludniowe